A list of films produced in Argentina in 1937:

1937
Films
Argentine